Merry Xmas Everybody: Party Hits is a compilation album by the British rock band Slade. Aimed at the Christmas market, the album was released on 23 November 2009 and reached No. 151 in the UK.

Track listing

Chart performance

Personnel
Noddy Holder - lead vocals, rhythm guitar
Dave Hill - lead guitar, backing vocals
Jim Lea - bass, piano, violin, keyboards, backing vocals
Don Powell - drums

References

2009 compilation albums
Slade compilation albums